Tatra KT8D5 is a bidirectional light rail vehicle currently (and not expected to retire soon) operating in Europe and Asia. In several variations, it was designed and manufactured by Czech engineering corporation ČKD Tatra from 1984 to 1999 and a total of 206 cars were sold. The vehicle has an angular design similar to Tatra T6A5, Tatra RT8D5M, and Tatra KT4 both outside and inside.  During its production period, several versions of KT8D5 were sold.

History 

The need for new generation vehicles for Czechoslovakia started in late 1970s. The original goal was to make a light rail vehicle with a higher capacity to meet growing demands for public transport. The project to design and build the KT8D5 was approved in 1982, and the first prototype was constructed in 1984. The first vehicles entered operation 1986 in Brno, Most and Košice.

Design and construction 
The Tatra KT8D5 is a large, high capacity tram constructed using three articulated body sections riding on four bogies. The middle section is located on two Jacobs bogies. The tram is bidirectional and has driving cabs at each end and doors on both sides. There are two pantographs, one located on the each end of vehicle.
With a capacity of up to 231 passengers, these trams are operated on the busiest routes and during peak hours; due to their bidirectional capability they are also frequently used on routes without termini and during track maintenance for continued operation on only one track in both directions.

Modernization
A new medium low-floor cell based on the KT8D5N was installed in Tatra KT8D5 trams in Czech Republic and Slovakia, and in one tram in Strausberg, Germany. The Togol 181, which is based on the KT8D5, was introduced in Pyongyang, North Korea in 2018.

From 1998 to 1999, ČKD built seven Tatra KT8D5N trams with a medium low-floor cell, IGBT transistors, and TV14 electrical equipment.

References
This article incorporates information from the corresponding article on the Czech Wikipedia.

External links

Tram vehicles of the Czech Republic
Train-related introductions in 1984
Tatra trams
Tram transport in North Korea